Dead in the West is a short horror novel written by American author Joe R. Lansdale. It involves the tale of longtime Lansdale character the Reverend Jebediah Mercer: he rides into the town of Mud Creek, Texas that is about to be attacked by an Indian medicine man who was unjustly lynched by the town inhabitants. Soon the dead will rise and seek human flesh and the Reverend finds himself right in the middle of it. He aligns himself with the town doctor and two of the town's inhabitants, Abbey and David. Together they fight the zombie horde and try to dispatch the medicine man who is the cause of all the evil.

An unabridged audiobook version of the story was released in 2014 by Skyboat Media with the title changed to "Deadman's Road", and performed by Stefan Rudnicki.

References

External links
  Author's Official Website
 Publisher's Website

Novels by Joe R. Lansdale
Novels set in Texas
American horror novels
American zombie novels
1986 American novels